Ennaivayal is a village in the Pattukkottai taluk of Thanjavur district, Tamil Nadu, India.

Demographics 

As per the 2001 census, Ennaivayal had a total population of 438 with 205 males and 233 females. The sex ratio was 1137. The literacy rate was 57.49.

References 

 

Villages in Thanjavur district